Visa requirements for Sammarinese citizens are administrative entry restrictions by the authorities of other states placed on citizens of San Marino. As of 2 July 2019, San Marino citizens had visa-free or visa on arrival access to 167 countries and territories, ranking the San Marino passport 20th in terms of travel freedom (tied with the passports of Croatia and United Arab Emirates) according to the Henley Passport Index. Currently (as of 2020) the San Marino passport is one of the four European "ordinary" passports to provide visa-free access to the People's Republic of China.

Besides the Sammarinese passport, there are only 3 other passports that provide either visa-free entry, or entry via an electronic travel authorisation, to the world's four largest economies: China (visa-free, 90 days), India (e-Visa, 60 days), the European Union (visa-free, 90 days within 180 days), and the United States (ESTA required for arrivals by air and sea, 90 days): those of Brunei, Japan, and Singapore.

San Marino and Russia signed a visa-free agreement on 2 December 2021, however it has not been implemented yet.

Visa requirements map

Visa requirements

Dependent, disputed, or restricted territories

Visa requirements for Sammarinese citizens for visits to various territories, disputed areas, partially recognised countries and restricted zones:

Non-visa restrictions

See also

 Visa policy of San Marino
 Visa policy of the Schengen Area
 Sammarinese passport
 Foreign relations of San Marino

References and Notes
References

Notes

San Marino
Foreign relations of San Marino